Geoffrey Herbert Barwick (29 September 1919 – 7 September 2004) was an  Australian rules footballer who played with Hawthorn in the Victorian Football League (VFL).

Prior to playing with Hawthorn, Barwick served for 18 months in the Australian Army during World War II.

Notes

External links 

1919 births
2004 deaths
Australian rules footballers from Tasmania
Hawthorn Football Club players
New Norfolk Football Club players